The Institute of the Josephites of Belgium, commonly called Josephites is a Roman Catholic clerical religious congregation of pontifical right for men devoted to the Christian education of the youth It was founded in Ghent Belgium by Canon van Crombrugghe, in 1817. Its members add the nominal letters C.J. after their names to indicate membership in the Institute.

While their primary apostolate is the education of the youth, they also have a missionary past in Africa. Their headquarters is at Karmelietenstraat 57, 9500 Geraardsbergen, Belgium. The organisation is a Congregation of Pontifical Right.

History 
The Josephites were founded in the Diocese of Ghent by Canon Constant van Crombrugghe in 1817. Members of the congregation use the initials "C.J." after their names.

The purpose was the education of children from poorer backgrounds who might not otherwise go to school. The congregation set up a commercial school and an industrial school.

As of 2017 the congregation had established four schools in Belgium, two in England, one in the United States, and nine in the Democratic Republic of Congo.

Statistics 
In 2018, they had 9 houses, with 111 members including 72 priests.

Prelates from their ranks 
 Deceased 
 Marcel Evariste van Rengen, C.J., Apostolic Prefect (1957 – 29 September 1964) Bishop of Mweka (Congo-Kinshasa) (29 September 1964 – death 15 March 1988)

Superiors general 
 Founder: Father Constant Guillaume van Crombrugghe (1817) (Belgium)
 
 Ignatius van den Bossche (1817 – 1851)
 Stanislas De Haeck (1851 – 1850)
 Remi de Saedeleer (1860 – 1869)
 Félicien Campe (1869 – 1893)
 Gustave De Meyer (1893 – 1898)
 Felix Vlieghe (1899 – 1922)
 Antonin Wicart (1922 – 1932)
 Théophile De Paepe (1933 – 1938)
 Hilaire Sterckx (1938 – 1950)
 Hubert Trévis (1950 – 1956)

 George Kean (1956 – 1962)
 Emmanuel Devroye (1962 – 1974)
 Leonard de Kort (1974 – 1983)
 John Mayhew (1983 – 1989)
 Jean-Marie Vander Stricht (1989 – 1990)
 Guillermo C. García (1990 – 1996)
 J Richard Lear (1996 – 2001)
 Robert D. Hamilton (2001 – 2016)
 Jacob Beya Kadumbu (2016 – )

See also
 St George's College, Weybridge

References

External links
 
 GigaCatholic 
 Archives of the Josephites of Belgium  in ODIS - Online Database for Intermediary Structures

Catholic orders and societies
Geraardsbergen